For Thermal conductance see:

 Thermal contact conductance
 Thermal conduction
 Thermal conductivity
 List of thermal conductivities